Henri Célestin Louis Dabadie (1 December 1867, Pau - 19 October 1949, Saint-Mandé) was a French landscape and Orientalist painter.

Biography
He was a student of Jules-Élie Delaunay and Henri Michel-Lévy. After completing his studies, he devoted himself to Impressionistic landscape painting; primarily in Brittany. He alo painted harbor scenes in Rotterdam and Hamburg.

From 1894, he was a regular exhibitor at the Salon of the Société des Artistes Français. He was awarded a third-class medal in 1895 and a second-class medal in 1901.

Thanks to the Société des Peintres Orientalistes Français, he was able to spend a year at the Villa Abd-el-Tif in Algeria, and pay a visit to Tunisia. In 1928, he was named a Knight in the Legion of Honor. That same year, he won the Prix de l'Indochine and settled in Hanoi, where he taught at the Hanoi College of Fine Arts, operated by Victor Tardieu.

Sources 
 Dabadie, Henri. In: Ulrich Thieme (Ed.): Allgemeines Lexikon der Bildenden Künstler von der Antike bis zur Gegenwart. Vol. 8: Coutan–Delattre. E. A. Seemann, Leipzig 1912, pgs. 247–248 Online
 Marion Vidal-Bué, Alger et ses peintres (1830-1960), Méditerranée, 2002, pg. 280 
 Élisabeth Cazenave, L'Afrique du Nord révélée par les musées de province, Bernard Giovanangeli Editeur, 2004

External links 

 More works by Dabadie @ ArtNet

19th-century French painters
French male painters
20th-century French painters
20th-century French male artists
1867 births
1949 deaths
19th-century French male artists